The Taroko Express is an express train service of the Taiwan Railways Administration, and is part of Tze-Chiang Limited Express. It began commercial operations on 16 February 2007.

The Taroko Express uses the tilting electrical multiple unit series known as TEMU1000 based on the JR Kyushu 885 series. They were imported to Taiwan in 2006; since 2007, they have been running between Hualien and Taipei City, on the curved Yilan line at the existing narrow gauge tracks, where they reduced traveling time between the two places from previously 3 hours down to about 2 hours.

On 2 April 2021, a Taroko Express train derailed in Hualien County, killing 49 people with many others injured.

See also 
 Rail transport in Taiwan
 Puyuma Express

References 

Electric multiple units of Taiwan
Tilting trains

25 kV AC multiple units
Hitachi multiple units